Orangeburg County is a county located in the U.S. state of South Carolina. As of the 2020 census, the population was 84,223. Its county seat is Orangeburg. The county was created in 1769.

Orangeburg County comprises the Orangeburg, SC Micropolitan Statistical Area, which is also included in the Columbia-Orangeburg-Newberry, SC Combined Statistical Area. It is located in the Midlands region of South Carolina.

It is the home of South Carolina State University, the only public four-year HBCU in the state of South Carolina. It is also home to Claflin University, the oldest historically black college or university (HBCU) in the state.

History
The district was occupied for thousands of years by succeeding cultures of indigenous peoples. By the time of European encounter, Siouan-speaking tribes, such as the Cheraw and Catawba, as well as the Pee Dee, inhabited the Piedmont area above the fall line.

The Orangeburg Judicial District was chartered by European Americans in 1769 from a mostly unorganized upland area between the Congaree and Savannah rivers. A county, initially of the same name but later called Orange, was organized within the district but deorganized in 1791, after the American Revolutionary War.

The southwest portion bordering on the Savannah River, about half of Orangeburg District, was separated and organized as Barnwell District in 1800.  In 1804 the northern third of the district was separated to form the new Lexington District, which gained another, smaller portion of Orangeburg District in 1832.

During the nineteenth century, the districts and counties were developed chiefly as cotton plantations for short-staple cotton.  This development followed the invention of the cotton gin in the late eighteenth century, which made the processing of short-staple cotton  profitable. The county became a center of labor by black slaves on the plantations, who were transported from coastal areas and the Upper South to cultivate and process cotton. Those brought from the coastal areas were likely of the Gullah culture and language. The enslaved African Americans greatly outnumbered the white planters and non-slaveholding whites. Reflecting the patterns of nineteenth-century settlement, the area is still chiefly agricultural and majority-African American in population.

In 1868, under the revised state constitution during the Reconstruction era, South Carolina districts were organized as counties. Resident voters were enabled to elect their state representatives rather than having them chosen by the state legislature, as was done previously. Election of representatives by the state legislature had kept the districts dominated by the elite owners of major plantations in the Low Country and elsewhere. The changes in rules expanded participation in the franchise by more male residents. Emancipation of slaves after the war under newly ratified federal constitutional amendments resulted in freedmen voting. Using voter intimidation, white Democrats took control of the state legislature by the end of the century; they passed state electoral laws and a new constitution that essentially disfranchised most blacks, a situation that lasted until after the federal legislation of the 1965 Voting Rights Act.

A small western portion of Orangeburg County was annexed in 1871 to the newly formed Aiken County during the Reconstruction era.

In 1908 the northern portion of the County along the Congaree River was separated and included in the newly formed Calhoun County, with its seat at Saint Matthews.  In 1910 a small western portion of Berkeley County, around Holly Hill and Eutawville, was annexed to Orangeburg County, thus bringing the county to its present size.

Geography

It is the second-largest county in South Carolina by land area and fifth-largest by land area.

Orangeburg county is a fairly big county, covering 1,128 square miles, it is about 60 miles from the western part of the county to the eastern part of the county. Orangeburg county lies within 3 "regions" of South Carolina. The western part of the county lies in the "CSRA" (Central Savannah River Area). The middle part of Orangeburg county is included in the "Midlands" Region. The eastern and south eastern part of the county are located in the "Lowcountry" region of the state.

State and local protected area 
 Indian Bluff Recreation Park
 Santee State Park

Major water bodies 
 Congaree River
 Cooper River
 Edisto River
 Four Hole Swamp
 Lake Marion
 North Fork Edisto River
 South Fork Edisto River

Adjacent counties

 Calhoun County - north
 Clarendon County - northeast
 Dorchester County - southeast
 Berkeley County - southeast
 Bamberg County - south
 Colleton County - south
 Aiken County - west
 Barnwell County - west
 Lexington County - northwest

Transportation

Railroads
At least four railroad lines run through Orangeburg County; a former Southern Railway Line, and three CSX lines, the westernmost which was formerly a Seaboard Air Line Railroad line running along US 321.

Major highways

Major infrastructure 
 North Air Force Auxiliary Field
 Orangeburg Municipal Airport
 RMC Heliport

Demographics

2020 census

As of the 2020 United States census, there were 84,223 people, 32,129 households, and 20,620 families residing in the county.

2010 census
At the 2010 census, there were 92,501 people, 35,788 households, and 23,580 families in the county. The racial makeup of the county was 62.2% black or African American, 34.3% white, 0.8% Asian, 0.5% American Indian, 0.9% from other races, and 1.2% from two or more races. Those of Hispanic or Latino origin made up 1.9% of the population. In terms of ancestry, 7.7% were American, and 5.1% were German.

Of the 35,788 households, 32.5% had children under the age of 18 living with them, 38.1% were married couples living together, 22.5% had a female householder with no husband present, 34.1% were non-families, and 29.0% of households were made up of individuals. The average household size was 2.49 and the average family size was 3.06. The median age was 38.1 years.

The median household income was $32,849 and the median family income  was $40,332. Males had a median income of $35,934 versus $28,508 for females. The per capita income for the county was $17,579. About 21.1% of families and 25.8% of the population were below the poverty line, including 32.9% of those under age 18 and 19.1% of those age 65 or over.

2000 census
At the 2000 census there were 91,582 people, 34,118 households, and 23,882 families in the county. The population density was 83 people per square mile (32/km2). There were 39,304 housing units at an average density of 36 per square mile (14/km2).  The racial makeup of the county was 60.86% Black or African American, 37.17% White, 0.46% Native American, 0.43% Asian, 0.02% Pacific Islander, 0.36% from other races, and 0.70% from two or more races.  0.96% of the population were Hispanic or Latino of any race.
Of the 34,118 households 32.00% had children under the age of 18 living with them, 45.10% were married couples living together, 20.30% had a female householder with no husband present, and 30.00% were non-families. 26.00% of households were one person and 10.30% were one person aged 65 or older.  The average household size was 2.58 and the average family size was 3.11.

The age distribution was 26.00% under the age of 18, 11.90% from 18 to 24, 26.10% from 25 to 44, 22.80% from 45 to 64, and 13.20% 65 or older.  The median age was 35 years. For every 100 females there were 87.00 males.  For every 100 females age 18 and over, there were 81.60 males.

The median household income was $29,567 and the median family income  was $36,165. Males had a median income of $29,331 versus $20,956 for females. The per capita income for the county was $15,057.  About 17.00% of families and 21.40% of the population were below the poverty line, including 27.20% of those under age 18 and 22.30% of those age 65 or over.

Native Americans 
The Beaver Creek Indians, the Pee Dee Indian Nation of Beaver Creek, and the Pine Hill Indian Tribe are three state-recognized Native American entities located in Orangeburg County.

The Beaver Creek Indians are descendants of around thirty mixed-blood tribes that merged as a result of colonization. Most tribal members descend from Lazarus Chavis. Their tribal office is located in the town of Salley.

The Pee Dee Indian Nation of Beaver Creek descends from the Pee Dee Indian families who came to Orangeburg County with Chief Lewis Jones. Members of this tribe also descend from the Pee Dee riflemen who fought in the Raccoon Company during the Revolutionary War. The Pee Dee Indians who came to this area started Rocky Swamp Indian Methodist Church. Many of their ancestors, along with the Beaver Creek tribe, were sent to the Four Pine School for Indians. The Pee Dee Indian Nation of Beaver Creek maintains a close relationship with their relatives in the Upstate bands and they jointly strive to preserve their culture and heritage.

The Pine Hill Indian Tribe resettled into the Pine Hill area of Orangeburg County after forced removal by the United States Government from their original land at the Congaree-Wateree River Basin in Richland County, identified in pre-colonial records as the center of Cofitachequi. Removal allowed the creation of Camp Jackson. Camp Jackson was deregulated and then reinstated as the military reservation now known as Fort Jackson, South Carolina. The Pine Hill Indian Tribe is acknowledged by the United States Government, recognized by the State of South Carolina, and is associated to the Treaty of New Echota signed by its ancestor John Fields.

Government and politics
Orangeburg is a solidly Democratic county in presidential elections; it has not voted Republican since 1972.

Economy
Orangeburg County is one of the largest agricultural producing counties in South Carolina, with fertile, slightly rolling land. Major crops are cotton, soybeans, corn, turf grass and watermelons.

Communities

City
 Orangeburg (county seat and largest city)

Towns

 Bowman
 Branchville
 Cope
 Cordova
 Elloree
 Eutawville
 Holly Hill
 Livingston
 Neeses
 North
 Norway
 Rowesville
 Santee
 Springfield
 Vance
 Woodford

Census-designated places
 Brookdale CDP
 Edisto CDP
 Wilkinson Heights CDP

See also 
 List of counties in South Carolina
 National Register of Historic Places listings in Orangeburg County, South Carolina
 South Carolina State Parks
 Beaver Creek Indian Tribe, state-recognized tribe that resides in the county
 Natchez Indian Tribe of South Carolina, state-recognized group that resides in the county

References

External links 

 
 

 
1769 establishments in South Carolina
Populated places established in 1769
Black Belt (U.S. region)
Majority-minority counties in South Carolina